Signal Hill is a mountain and the second-highest point on Antigua island, in Antigua and Barbuda.

Geography

The mountain overlooks the south coast of Antigua to the west of Falmouth Harbour. 

The highest point on Antigua is Boggy Peak, also in the Shekerley Mountains.

See also
 
 

Landforms of Antigua and Barbuda
Saint Mary Parish, Antigua and Barbuda
Hills of the Caribbean
Mountains of the Caribbean